Fossil fuel phase-out is the gradual reduction of the use and production of fossil fuels to zero, to reduce deaths and illness from air pollution, limit climate change, and to strengthen energy independence. It is part of the ongoing renewable energy transition.

Although many countries are shutting down coal-fired power stations, electricity generation is not moving off coal fast enough to meet climate goals. Many countries have set dates to stop selling gasoline and diesel cars and trucks, but a timetable to stop burning fossil gas has not yet been agreed.

Current efforts in fossil fuel phase-out involve replacing fossil fuels with sustainable energy sources in sectors such as transport and heating. Alternatives to fossil fuels include electrification, green hydrogen and biofuel. Phase-out policies include both demand-side and supply-side constraints. Whereas demand-side approaches seek to reduce fossil-fuel consumption, supply-side initiatives seek to constrain production to accelerate the pace of energy transition and reduction in emissions. It has been suggested that laws should be passed to make fossil fuel companies bury the same amount of carbon as they emit. The International Energy Agency estimates that in order to achieve carbon neutrality by the middle of the century, global investments in renewable energy must treble by 2030, reaching over $4 trillion annually.

Scope 
While crude oil and natural gas are also being phased out in chemical processes (e.g. production of new building blocks for plastics) as the circular economy and biobased economy (e.g. bioplastics) are being developed to reduce plastic pollution, the fossil fuel phase out specifically aims to end the burning of fossil fuels and the consequent production of greenhouse gases. Therefore, attempts to reduce the use of oil and gas in the plastic industry do not form part of fossil fuel phase-out or reduction plans.

Types of fossil fuels

Coal 

Coal use peaked in 2013 but to meet the Paris Agreement target of keeping global warming to well below  coal use needs to halve from 2020 to 2030. However , coal supplied over a quarter of the world's primary energy and about 40% of the greenhouse gas emissions from fossil fuels. Phasing out coal has short-term health and environmental benefits which exceed the costs, and without it the 2 °C target in the Paris Agreement cannot be met; but some countries still favour coal, and there is much disagreement about how quickly it should be phased out.

, 30 countries and many sub-national governments and businesses had become members of the Powering Past Coal Alliance, each making a declaration to advance the transition away from unabated coal power generation. , however, the countries which use the most coal have not joined, and some countries continue to build and finance new coal-fired power stations. A just transition from coal is supported by the European Bank for Reconstruction and Development.

In 2019 the UN Secretary General said that countries should stop building new coal power plants from 2020 or face 'total disaster'.

In 2020, although China built some plants, globally more coal power was retired than built: the UN Secretary General has said that OECD countries should stop generating electricity from coal by 2030 and the rest of the world by 2040.

Oil 

Crude oil is refined into fuel oil, diesel and gasoline. The refined products are primarily for transportation by conventional cars, trucks, trains, planes and ships.  Popular alternatives are human-powered transport, public transport, electric vehicles, and biofuels.

Natural gas 

Natural gas is widely used to generate electricity and has an emission intensity of about 500g/kWh. Heating is also a major source of carbon dioxide emissions. Leaks are also a large source of atmospheric methane.

In some countries natural gas is being used as a temporary "bridge fuel" to replace coal, in turn to be replaced by renewable sources or a hydrogen economy. However this "bridge fuel" may significantly extend the use of fossil fuel or strand assets, such as gas-fired power plants built in the 2020s, as the average plant life is 35 years. Although natural gas assets are likely to be stranded later than oil and coal assets, perhaps not until 2050, some investors are concerned by reputational risk.

Natural gas phase-out is progressing in some regions, for example with increasing use of hydrogen by the European Network of Transmission System Operators for Gas (ENTSOG) and changes to building regulations to reduce the use of gas heating.

Reasons 
Commonly cited reasons for phasing out fossil fuels are to:
 reduce deaths and illness caused by air pollution
 limit climate change
 reduce fossil fuel subsidies
 strengthen energy independence – countries with low or no fossil fuel deposits often transition away from fossil fuels to gain energy independently

Health 

Most of the millions of premature deaths from air pollution are due to fossil fuels. Pollution may be indoors e.g. from heating and cooking, or outdoors from vehicle exhaust. One estimate is that the proportion is 65% and the number 3.5 million each year. According to Professor Sir Andy Haines at the London School of Hygiene & Tropical Medicine the health benefits of phasing out fossil fuels measured in money (estimated by economists using the value of life for each country) are substantially more than the cost of achieving the 2-degree C goal of the Paris Agreement.

Climate change mitigation 
Fossil-fuel phase-out is the largest part of limiting global warming as they account for over 70% of greenhouse gas emissions, but  needs to move 4 times faster to meet the goals of the Paris Agreement. To achieve the climate goal the vast majority of fossil fuel reserves owned today by countries and companies must remain in the ground.

Employment 

The renewable energy transition can create jobs through the construction of new power plants and the manufacturing of the equipment that they need, as was seen in the case of Germany and the wind power industry.

This can also be seen in the case of France and the nuclear power industry. France receives about 75% of its electricity from nuclear energy and hundreds of jobs have been created for developing nuclear technology, construction workers, engineers, and radiation protection specialists.

Energy independence
Countries which lack fossil fuel deposits, particularly coal but also petroleum and natural gas, often cite energy independence in their shift away from fossil fuels.

In Switzerland the decision to  electrify virtually the entire  railway network was taken in light of the two world wars (during which Switzerland was neutral) when coal imports became increasingly difficult. As Switzerland has ample hydropower resources, electric trains (as opposed to those driven by steam locomotives or diesel) could be run on domestic energy resources, reducing the need for coal imports.

The 1973 oil crisis also led to a shift in energy policy in many places to become (more) independent of fossil fuel imports. In France the government announced  an ambitious plan to expand nuclear power which by the end of the 1980s had shifted France's electricity sector almost entirely away from coal gas and oil and towards nuclear power.

The trend towards encouraging cycling in the Netherlands and Denmark also coincided with the 1973 oil crisis and aimed in part at reducing the need for oil imports in the transportation sector.

Phase-out of fossil fuel subsidies 
 
Significant fossil fuel subsidies are present in many countries. Fossil fuel subsidies in 2019 for consumption totalled USD 320 billion spread over many countries.   governments subsidise fossil fuels by about $500 billion per year: however using an unconventional definition of subsidy which includes failing to price greenhouse gas emissions, the International Monetary Fund estimated that fossil fuel subsidies were $5.2 trillion in 2017, which was 6.4% of global GDP. Some fossil fuel companies lobby governments.

Phasing out fossil fuel subsidies is very important. It must however be done carefully to avoid protests and making poor people poorer. In most cases, however, low fossil fuel prices benefit wealthier households more than poorer households. So to help poor and vulnerable people, other measures than fossil fuel subsidies would be more targeted. This could in turn increase public support for subsidy reform.

Economic theory indicates that the optimal policy would be to remove coal mining and burning subsidies and replace them with optimal taxes. Global studies indicate that even without introducing taxes, subsidy and trade barrier removal at a sectoral level would improve efficiency and reduce environmental damage. Removal of these subsidies would substantially reduce GHG emissions and create jobs in renewable energy.

The actual effects of removing fossil fuel subsidies would depend heavily on the type of subsidy removed and the availability and economics of other energy sources. There is also the issue of carbon leakage, where removal of a subsidy to an energy-intensive industry could lead to a shift in production to another country with less regulation, and thus to a net increase in global emissions.

In developed countries, energy costs are low and heavily subsidised, whereas in developing countries, the poor pay high costs for low-quality services. It is difficult to measure energy subsidies, but there was some evidence in 2001 that coal production subsidies had declined in several developing and OECD countries.

A plan has been put forward to power 100% of the world's energy with wind, hydroelectric, and solar power by the year 2030. It recommends transfer of energy subsidies from fossil fuel to renewable, and a price on carbon reflecting its cost for flood, cyclone, hurricane, drought, and related extreme weather expenses.

Excluding subsidies the levelised cost of electricity from new large-scale solar power in India and China has been below existing coal-fired power stations since 2021.

A study by Rice University Center for Energy Studies suggested the following steps for countries:
 Countries should commit to a specific time frame for a full phaseout of implicit and explicit fossil fuel subsidies.
 Clarify the language on subsidy reform to remove ambiguous terminology.
 Seek formal legislation in affected countries that codifies reform pathways and reduces opportunities for backsliding.
 Publish transparent formulas for market-linked pricing, and adhere to a regular schedule for price adjustments.
 Phase-in full reforms in a sequence of gradual steps. Increasing prices gradually but on a defined schedule signals intent to consumers while allowing time to invest in energy efficiency to partially offset the increases.
 Aspire to account for externalities over time by imposing a fee or tax on fossil energy products and services, and eliminating preferences for fossil fuels that remain embedded in the tax code.
 Use direct cash transfers to maintain benefits for poor segments of society rather than preserving subsidised prices for vulnerable socioeconomic groups.
 Launch a comprehensive public communications campaign.
 Any remaining fossil fuel subsidies should be clearly budgeted at full international prices and paid for by the national treasury.
 Document price and emissions changes with reporting requirements.

Studies about fossil fuel phase-out 

In 2015, Greenpeace and Climate Action Network Europe released a report highlighting the need for an active phase-out of coal-fired generation across Europe.  Their analysis derived from a database of 280 coal plants and included emissions data from official EU registries.

A 2016 report by Oil Change International, concludes that the carbon emissions embedded in the coal, oil, and gas in currently working mines and fields, assuming that these run to the end of their working lifetimes, will take the world to just beyond the 2°C limit contained in the 2015 Paris Agreement and even further from the 1.5°C goal. The report observes that "one of the most powerful climate policy levers is also the simplest: stop digging for more fossil fuels".

In 2016, the Overseas Development Institute (ODI) and 11 other NGOs released a report on the impact of building new coal-fired power plants in countries where a significant proportion of the population lacks access to electricity.  The report concludes that, on the whole, building coal-fired power plants does little to help the poor and may make them poorer.  Moreover, wind and solar generation are beginning to challenge coal on cost.

A 2018 study in Nature Energy, suggests that 10 countries in Europe could completely phase out coal-fired electricity generation with their current infrastructure, whilst the United States and Russia could phase out at least 30%.

In 2020, the Fossil Fuel Cuts Database provided the first global account of supply-side initiatives to constrain fossil fuel production. The latest update of the database recorded 1967 initiatives implemented between 1988 and October 2021 in 110 countries across seven major types of supply-side approaches (Divestment, n=1201; Blockades, n= 374; Litigation, n= 192; Moratoria and Bans, n= 146; Production subsidies removal, n=31; Carbon tax on fossil fuel production, n=16; Emissions Trading Schemes, n= 7).

The GeGaLo index of geopolitical gains and losses assesses how the geopolitical position of 156 countries may change if the world fully transitions to renewable energy resources. Former fossil fuel exporters are expected to lose power, while the positions of former fossil fuel importers and countries rich in renewable energy resources is expected to strengthen.

Multiple decarbonisation plans that get to zero CO2 emissions have been presented.

A Guardian investigation showed in 2022, that big fossil fuel firms continue to plan huge investments in new fossil fuel production projects that would drive the climate past internationally agreed temperature limits.

Renewable energy potentials
In June 2021 Dr Sven Teske and Dr Sarah Niklas from the Institute for Sustainable Futures, University of Technology Sydney found that "existing coal, oil and gas production puts the world on course to overshoot Paris climate targets." In co-operation with the Fossil Fuel Non-Proliferation Treaty Initiative they published a report entitled, Fossil Fuel Exit Strategy: An orderly wind down of coal, oil, and gas to meet the Paris Agreement. It analyses global renewable energy potential, and finds that "every region on Earth can replace fossil fuels with renewable energy to keep warming below 1.5ºC and provide reliable energy access to all."

Assessment of extraction prevention responsibilities
In September 2021, the first scientific assessment of the minimum amount of fossil fuels that would need to be secured from extraction per region as well as globally, to allow for a 50% probability of limiting global warming by 2050 to 1.5 °C was provided.

Challenges of fossil fuel phase-out 
The phase-out of fossil fuels involves many challenges, and one of them is the reliance that the world currently has on them.

Fossil fuel phase-out may lead to an increment in electricity prices, because of the new investments needed to replace their share in the electricity mix with alternative energy sources.

Another impact of a phase-out of fossil fuels is in employment. In the case of employment in the fossil fuel industry, a phase-out is logically undesired, therefore, people employed in the industry will usually oppose any measures that put their industries under scrutiny. Endre Tvinnereim and Elisabeth Ivarsflaten studied the relationship between employment in the fossil fuel industry with the support to climate change policies. They proposed that one opportunity for displaced drilling employments in the fossil fuel industry could be in the geothermal energy industry. This was suggested as a result of their conclusion: people and companies in the fossil fuel industry will likely oppose measures that endanger their employment, unless they have other stronger alternatives. This can be extrapolated to political interests, that can push against the phase-out of fossil fuels initiative. One example is how the vote of United States Congress members is related to the preeminence of fossil fuel industries in their respective states.

Other challenges include ensuring sustainable recycling, sourcing of the required materials, disruptions of existing power structures, managing variable renewable energy, developing optimal national transition policies, transforming transportation infrastructure and responsibilities of fossil fuel extraction prevention. There is active research and development on such issues.

According to the people present at COP27 in Egypt, Saudi Arabian representatives pushed to block a call for the world to burn less oil. After objections from Saudi Arabia and a few other oil producers, summit's final statement failed to include a call for nations to phase out fossil fuels. In March 2022, at a United Nations meeting with climate scientists, Saudi Arabia, together with Russia, pushed to delete a reference to "human-induced climate change" from an official document, disputing the scientifically established fact that the burning of fossil fuels by humans is the main driver of the climate crisis.

Major initiatives and legislation to phase out fossil fuels

China 
China has pledged to become carbon neutral by 2060, which would need a just transition for over 3 million workers in the coal-mining and power industry. It is not yet clear whether China aims to phase-out all fossil fuel use by that date or whether a small proportion will still be in use with the carbon captured and stored. In 2021, coal mining was ordered to run at maximum capacity.

EU 
At the end of 2019, the European Union launched its European Green Deal.
It included:
 a revision of the Energy Taxation Directive which is looking closely at fossil fuel subsidies and tax exemptions (aviation, shipping)
 a circular economy action plan,
 a review and possible revision (where needed) of the all relevant climate-related policy instruments, including the Emissions Trading System
 a sustainable and smart mobility strategy
 potential carbon tariffs for countries that don't curtail their greenhouse gas pollution at the same rate. The mechanism to achieve this is called the Carbon Border Adjustment Mechanism (CBAM).
It also leans on Horizon Europe, to play a pivotal role in leveraging national public and private investments. Through partnerships with industry and member States, it will support research and innovation on transport technologies, including batteries, clean hydrogen, low-carbon steel making, circular bio-based sectors and the built environment.

The European Investment Bank contributed over €81 billion to help the energy industry between 2017 and 2022, in line with EU energy policy. This comprised nearly €76 billion for initiatives related to power grids, energy efficiency, and renewable energy throughout Europe and other parts of the world.

India
India is confident of exceeding Paris COP commitments. In the Paris Agreement, India has committed to an Intended Nationally Determined Contributions target of achieving 40% of its total electricity generation from non-fossil fuel sources by 2030.

Japan 

Japan has pledged to become carbon neutral by 2050.

United Kingdom 

The UK is legally committed to be carbon neutral by 2050, and moving away from the heating of homes by natural gas is likely to be the most difficult part of the country's fossil fuel phase out.

Legislation and initiatives to phase out coal

Phase-out of fossil fuel power plants 

Alternative energy refers to any source of energy that can substitute the role of fossil fuels. Renewable energy, or energy that is harnessed from renewable sources, is an alternative energy. However, alternative energy can refer to non-renewable sources as well, like nuclear energy. Between the alternative sources of energy are: solar energy, hydroelectricity, marine energy, wind energy, geothermal energy, biofuels, ethanol and hydrogen.

Energy efficiency is complementary to the use of alternative energy sources, when phasing-out fossil fuels.

Renewable energy

Hydroelectricity 

In 2015, hydroelectric energy generated 16.6% of the world's total electricity and 70% of all renewable electricity. In Europe and North America environmental concerns around land flooded by large reservoirs ended 30 years of dam construction in the 1990s. Since then large dams and reservoirs continue to be built in countries like China, Brazil and India. Run-of-the-river hydroelectricity and small hydro have become popular alternatives to conventional dams that may create reservoirs in environmentally sensitive areas.

Wind power

Solar 

In 2017, solar power provided 1.7% of total worldwide electricity production, growing at 35% per annum.
By 2020 the solar contribution to global final energy consumption is expected to exceed 1%.

Solar photovoltaics 

Solar photovoltaic cells convert sunlight into electricity and many solar photovoltaic power stations have been built. The size of these stations has increased progressively over the last decade with frequent new capacity records. Many of these plants are integrated with agriculture and some use innovative tracking systems that follow the sun's daily path across the sky to generate more electricity than conventional fixed-mounted systems. Solar power plants have no fuel costs or emissions during operation.

Concentrated solar power 

Concentrating Solar Power (CSP) systems use lenses or mirrors and tracking systems to focus a large area of sunlight into a small beam. The concentrated heat is then used as a heat source for a conventional power plant. A wide range of concentrating technologies exists; the most developed are the parabolic trough, the concentrating linear fresnel reflector, the Stirling dish and the solar power tower. Various techniques are used to track the Sun and focus light. In all of these systems a working fluid is heated by the concentrated sunlight, and is then used for power generation or energy storage.

Nuclear energy 

The 2014 Intergovernmental Panel on Climate Change (IPCC) report identifies nuclear energy as one of the technologies that can provide electricity with less than 5% of the lifecycle greenhouse gas emissions of coal power. There are more than 60 nuclear reactors shown as under construction in the list of Nuclear power by country with China leading at 23. Globally, more nuclear power reactors have closed than opened in recent years but overall capacity has increased. China has stated its plans to double nuclear generation by 2030. India also plans to greatly increase its nuclear power. The Manhattan 2 Project has presented a report that describes how to significantly increase nuclear power via factory automation.

Several countries have enacted laws to cease construction on new nuclear power stations. Several European countries have debated nuclear phase-outs and others have completely shut down some reactors. Three nuclear accidents have influenced the slowdown of nuclear power: the 1979 Three Mile Island accident in the United States, the 1986 Chernobyl disaster in the USSR, and the 2011 Fukushima nuclear disaster in Japan. Following the March 2011 Fukushima nuclear disaster, Germany has permanently shut down eight of its 17 reactors and pledged to close the rest by the end of 2022. Italy voted overwhelmingly to keep their country non-nuclear. Switzerland and Spain have banned the construction of new reactors. Japan's prime minister has called for a dramatic reduction in Japan's reliance on nuclear power. Taiwan's president did the same. Shinzō Abe, prime minister of Japan since December 2012, announced a plan to restart some of the 54 Japanese nuclear power plants and to continue some nuclear reactors under construction.

As of 2016, countries such as Australia, Austria, Denmark, Greece, Malaysia, New Zealand and Norway have no nuclear power stations and remain opposed to nuclear power. Germany, Italy, Spain and Switzerland are phasing-out their nuclear power. Despite this, most pathways for spurring a fossil fuel phase-out that keeps pace with global electricity demands include the expansion of nuclear power, according to the IPCC. Likewise, the United Nations Economic Commission for Europe has stated that global climate objectives would likely not be met without nuclear expansion.

Cost overruns, construction delays, the threat of catastrophic accidents, and regulatory hurdles often make nuclear power plant expansion practically infeasible. Some companies and organisations have proposed plans aimed at mitigating the cost, duration, and risk of nuclear power plant construction. NuScale Power, for example, has received regulatory approval from the Nuclear Regulatory Commission for a light-water reactor that would theoretically limit the risk of accidents and could be manufactured for less than traditional nuclear plants. The Energy Impact Center's OPEN100, a platform that provides open-source blueprints for the construction of a nuclear plant with a 100-megawatt pressurised water reactor, claims that its model could be built in as little as two years for $300 million. In both plans, the ability to mass manufacture small modular reactors would theoretically cut down on construction time.

Biomass 

Biomass is biological material from living, or recently living organisms, most often referring to plants or plant-derived materials. As a renewable energy source, biomass can either be used directly, or indirectly once or converted into another type of energy product such as biofuel. Biomass can be converted to energy in three ways: thermal conversion, chemical conversion, and biochemical conversion.

Using biomass as a fuel produces air pollution in the form of carbon monoxide, carbon dioxide, NOx (nitrogen oxides), VOCs (volatile organic compounds), particulates and other pollutants at levels above those from traditional fuel sources such as coal or natural gas in some cases (such as with indoor heating and cooking). Use of wood biomass as a fuel can also produce fewer particulate and other pollutants than open burning as seen in wildfires or direct heat applications. Black carbon a pollutant created by combustion of fossil fuels, biofuels, and biomass is possibly the second largest contributor to global warming. In 2009 a Swedish study of the giant brown haze that periodically covers large areas in South Asia determined that it had been principally produced by biomass burning, and to a lesser extent by fossil fuel burning. Denmark has increased the use of biomass and garbage, and decreased the use of coal.

Energy efficiency 

Moving away from fossil fuels will require changes not only in the way energy is supplied, but in the way it is used, and reducing the amount of energy required to deliver various goods or services is essential. Opportunities for improvement on the demand side of the energy equation are as rich and diverse as those on the supply side, and often offer significant economic benefits.

A sustainable energy economy requires commitments to both renewables and efficiency.  Renewable energy and energy efficiency are said to be the "twin pillars" of sustainable energy policy. The American Council for an Energy-Efficient Economy has explained that both resources must be developed to stabilise and reduce carbon dioxide emissions:
Efficiency is essential to slowing the energy demand growth so that rising clean energy supplies can make deep cuts in fossil fuel use. If energy use grows too fast, renewable energy development will chase a receding target. Likewise, unless clean energy supplies come online rapidly, slowing demand growth will only begin to reduce total emissions; reducing the carbon content of energy sources is also needed.

The IEA has stated that renewable energy and energy efficiency policies are complementary tools for the development of a sustainable energy future, and should be developed together instead of being developed in isolation.

Phase-out of fossil fuel vehicles 

Many countries and cities have introduced bans on the sales of new internal combustion engine vehicles, requiring all new cars to be electric vehicles or otherwise powered by clean, non-emitting sources. Such bans include the United Kingdom by 2035 and Norway by 2025. Many transit authorities are working to purchase only electric buses while also restricting use of ICE vehicles in the city center to limit air pollution. Many US states have a zero-emissions vehicle mandate, incrementally requiring a certain per cent of cars sold to be electric. The German term :de: Verkehrswende ("traffic transition" analogous to "Energiewende", energetic transition) calls for a shift from combustion powered road transport to bicycles, walking and rail transport and the replacement of remaining road vehicles with electric traction.

Biofuels 

Biofuels, in the form of liquid fuels derived from plant materials, are entering the market. However, many of the biofuels that are currently being supplied have been criticised for their adverse impacts on the natural environment, food security, and land use.

Public opinion

Opinion polls

Gallup 
In 2013, the Gallup organisation determined that 41% of Americans wanted less emphasis placed on coal energy, versus 31% who wanted more. Large majorities wanted more emphasis placed on solar (76%), wind (71%), and natural gas (65%).

Environmental Defense Fund 
The US-based Environmental Defense Fund (EDF) has taken a stand in favour of natural gas production and hydraulic fracturing, while pressing for stricter environmental controls on gas drilling, as a feasible way to replace coal. The organisation has funded studies jointly with the petroleum industry on the environmental effects of natural gas production. The organisation sees natural gas as a way to quickly replace coal, and that natural gas in time will be replaced by renewable energy. The policy has been criticised by some environmentalists.

Other groups supporting a coal moratorium 
 1Sky
 Co-op America
 Energy Action Coalition
 Kansas Sierra Club
 Lead for Energy Action Now (CLEAN)
 Rainforest Action Network
 Rising Tide Australia
 Sierra Club
 SixDegrees.org
 Step It Up 2007

Prominent individuals supporting a coal moratorium 
 US politician Al Gore stated:

Prominent individuals supporting a coal phase-out 
 Eric Schmidt, then CEO of Google, called for replacing all fossil fuels with renewable sources of energy in twenty years.

Mitigation of peak oil

The mitigation of peak oil is the attempt to delay the date and minimize the social and economic effects of peak oil by reducing the consumption of and reliance on petroleum. By reducing petroleum consumption, mitigation efforts seek to favorably change the shape of the Hubbert curve, which is the graph of real oil production over time predicted by Hubbert peak theory.  The peak of this curve is known as peak oil, and by changing the shape of the curve, the timing of the peak in oil production is affected. An analysis by the author of the Hirsch report showed that while the shape of the oil production curve can be affected by mitigation efforts, mitigation efforts are also affected by the shape of Hubbert curve.

For the most part, mitigation involves fuel conservation, and the use of alternative and renewable energy sources.  The development of unconventional oil resources can extend the supply of petroleum, but does not reduce consumption.

Historically, world oil consumption data show that mitigation efforts during the 1973 and 1979 oil shocks lowered oil consumption, while general recessions since the 1970s have had no effect on curbing the oil consumption until 2007. In the United States, oil consumption declines in reaction to high prices.

Key questions for mitigation are the viability of methods, the roles of government and private sector and how early these solutions are implemented. The responses to such questions and steps taken towards mitigation may determine whether or not the lifestyle of a society can be maintained, and may affect the population capacity of the planet.

Alternative energy
The most effective method of mitigating peak oil is to use renewable or alternative energy sources in place of petroleum.

Iceland was the first country to suggest transitioning to 100% renewable energy, using hydrogen for vehicles and its fishing fleet, in 1998, but the actual progress has been very limited.

Transportation fuel use
Because most oil is consumed for transportation most mitigation discussions revolve around transportation issues.

Fuel substitution

While there is some interchangeability, the alternative energy sources available tend to depend on whether the fuel is being used in static or mobile applications.

Biofuel

Static installations
Although oil and diesel still generates a small share of global electricity, some Middle East oil producing countries are replacing that with solar power, as it is more profitable to export the oil.

Mobile applications

Due to its high energy density and ease of handling, oil has a unique role as a transportation fuel. There are, however, a number of possible alternatives. Among the biofuels the use of bioethanol and biodiesel is already established to some extent in some countries.

The use of hydrogen fuel is another alternative under development in various countries, alongside, hydrogen vehicles though hydrogen is actually an energy storage medium, not a primary energy source, and consequently the use of a non-petroleum source would be required to extract the hydrogen for use. Though hydrogen is currently outperformed in terms of cost and efficiency by battery powered vehicles, there are applications where it would come in useful. Short haul ferries and very cold climates are two examples. Hydrogen fuel cells are about a third as efficient as batteries and double the efficiency of gasoline vehicles.

Electric vehicles powered by batteries are another alternative, and these have the advantage of having the highest well-to-wheels efficiency rate of any energy pathway and thus would allow much greater numbers of vehicles than any other methods. In addition, even if the electricity was sourced from coal-fired power plants, two advantages would remain: first it is cheaper to sequester carbon from a few thousand smokestacks than it is to retrofit hundreds of millions of vehicles, and second encouraging the use of electric vehicles allows a further pathway for scaling up of renewable energy sources.

Alternative aviation fuel
The Airbus A380 flew on alternative fuel for the first time on 1 February 2008. Boeing also plans to use alternative fuel on the 747. Because some biofuels such as ethanol contains less energy, more "tankstops" might be necessary for such planes.

The US Air Force is currently in the process of certifying its entire fleet to run on a 50/50 blend of synthetic fuel derived from the Fischer–Tropsch process and JP-8 jet fuel.

Conservation
When alternative fuels are not available, the development of more energy efficient vehicles becomes an important mitigant. Some ways of decreasing the oil used in transportation include increasing the use of bicycles, public transport, carpooling, electric vehicles, and diesel and hybrid vehicles with higher fuel efficiency.

More comprehensive mitigations include better land use planning through smart growth to reduce the need for private transportation, increased capacity and use of mass transit, vanpooling and carpooling, bus rapid transit, remote work, and human-powered transport from current levels. Rationing and driving bans are also forms of reducing private transportation. The higher oil prices of 2007 and 2008 caused United States drivers to begin driving less in 2007 and to a much greater extent in the first three months of 2008.

In order to deal with potential problems from peak oil, Colin Campbell has proposed the Rimini protocol, a plan which among other things would require countries to balance oil consumption with their current production.

See also

 Backstop resources
 Biodiesel
 Carbon bubble
 Carbon-neutral fuel
 Eco-economic decoupling
 Electricity generation
 Energy policy
 Energy security
 Environmental impact of the coal industry
 COVID-19 pandemic's effect on the fossil fuel industry
 Fossil fuel divestment
 Fossil Fuel Non-Proliferation Treaty Initiative
 Global strategic petroleum reserves
 Green growth
 Green recovery
 Measures taken to address the economic impact of the COVID-19 pandemic
 Low-carbon economy
 Mitigation of climate change
 Making Sweden an Oil-Free Society - a mitigation proposal
 Negative externalities
 Pickens plan
 POLES, an energy model
 Renewable energy commercialisation
 Repurposing offshore drilling rigs for storing carbon
 Soft energy path
 Special Period - how Cuba dealt with the end of cheap Soviet oil
 Torrefaction, of biomass, for a coal-like replacement
 World energy resources and consumption

References

External links
 Amory Lovins: Winning the oil endgame on TED.com - a discussion of how the United States can stop importing oil by 2045, based on research commissioned by The Pentagon
 Oil Depletion Analysis Centre in the United Kingdom
 
 Big Shift: Campaign to end to public financing of fossil fuels
 "Global Fossil Infrastructure Tracker" 

Coal phase-out
Emissions reduction
Energy policy
Technological phase-outs
Peak oil
Petroleum politics
Peak oil